Publishing Ireland (Foilsiú Éireann) is the Irish Book Publishers' Association.

Publishing Ireland was founded as CLÉ – Irish Book Publishers’ Association in 1970. It has 106 members, 93 of whom are professional book-publishing companies.

Members

 An Gúm
 Blackhall Publishing
 Blackstaff Press
 Chartered Accountants Ireland
 Liberties Press
 Maverick House Publishers
 Mercier Press
 O'Brien Press

See also
 International Publishers Association

References

External links
Official website

Publishing companies of Ireland
Organizations established in 1970
1970 establishments in Ireland
Economy of Ireland
Arts and media trade groups
Mass media in Ireland
All-Ireland organisations
Publishing by country